Apriona novaeguineae is a species of beetle in the family Cerambycidae. It was described by Gilmour in 1958. It is known from Papua New Guinea.

References

Batocerini
Beetles described in 1958
Beetles of Oceania